Mathilda Lundström (born 20 December 1996) is a Swedish handball player for Silkeborg-Voel and the Swedish national team.

Achievements 
Swedish Championship:
Winner: 2022

References

External links

1996 births
Living people
Handball players from Stockholm
Swedish female handball players
IK Sävehof players
Handball players at the 2020 Summer Olympics
Olympic handball players of Sweden
Expatriate handball players
Swedish expatriate sportspeople in Denmark
21st-century Swedish women